Vetrnik is a dispersed settlement in the Municipality of Kozje in eastern Slovenia. It lies in the southern part of the Sava Hills west and south of Kozje. The area is part of the historical Styria region. The municipality is now included in the Savinja Statistical Region.

References

External links
Vetrnik on Geopedia

Populated places in the Municipality of Kozje